The 40th Golden Horse Awards (Mandarin:第40屆金馬獎) took place on December 13, 2003 at Tainan Municipal Cultural Center in Tainan, Taiwan.

References

40th
2003 film awards
2003 in Taiwan